The women's 5000 metres at the 2022 European Athletics Championships took place at the Olympic Stadium on 18 August.

Records

Schedule

Results

Final

References

5000 W
5000 metres at the European Athletics Championships
Euro